Goulds Country is a rural locality in the local government area (LGA) of Break O'Day in the North-east LGA region of Tasmania. The 2016 census recorded a population of 77 for the state suburb of Goulds Country.

History 
Goulds Country was gazetted as a locality in 1969. 

The area was previously a tin mining town known as Dumara or Kunnarra.

Geography
The George River forms part of the southern boundary. The Great Musselroe River rises in the locality and flows through to the north.

Road infrastructure 
Route A3 (Tasman Highway) passes through from south-west to south-east. Route C841 (Terrys Hill Road / Counsels Road) starts at an intersection with A3 on the south-east boundary, and runs north outside the eastern boundary before passing through the north-east corner.

References

Towns in Tasmania
Localities of Break O'Day Council